São Tomé and Príncipe competed at the 2010 Summer Youth Olympics, the inaugural Youth Olympic Games, held in Singapore from 14 August to 26 August 2010.

Athletics

Boys
Track and road events

Canoeing

Boys

Girls

Taekwondo

References

External links
Competitors List: São Tomé and Príncipe – Singapore 2010 official site

2010 in São Tomé and Príncipe
Nations at the 2010 Summer Youth Olympics
São Tomé and Príncipe at the Youth Olympics